The 1938–39 international cricket season was from September 1938 to April 1939. The season consists with single international tour.

Season overview

December

England in South Africa

References

International cricket competitions by season
1938 in cricket
1939 in cricket